West Chester is an unincorporated community in Tuscarawas County, in the U.S. state of Ohio.

History
West Chester was laid out and platted in 1814. An old variant name of West Chester was Cadwallader. A post office called Cadwallader was established in 1828, and remained in operation until 1918.

References

Unincorporated communities in Tuscarawas County, Ohio
Unincorporated communities in Ohio